This is a list of locations in the New Forest, England.

 Ashurst
 Bank
 Bartley
 Beaulieu
 Beaulieu Heath
 Beaulieu Road railway station
 Black Gutter Bottom
 Blackwater Arboretum
 Bolderwood
 Bramshaw
 Brockenhurst
 Brook
 Bucklers Hard
 Burley
 Cadnam
 Denny Wood
 East Boldre
 Eling
 Exbury
 Exbury Gardens
 Eyeworth Pond
 Fordingbridge
 Fritham
 Godshill
 Hamptworth
 Hyde
 Hale
 Holbury
 Hythe, Hampshire
 Lover
 Lyndhurst
 Marchwood
 Matley Bog
 Minstead
 Milford on Sea
 Needs Ore Point
 New Milton
 Nomansland
 North Gorley
 Ocknell Plain
 Pitts Wood
 Redlynch
 Rufus Stone
 Rhinefield
 Sowley Pond
 Sway
 Woodlands

References 

 l
New Forest
New Forest
New Forest